Vice-Admiral Sir Paul Kenneth Haddacks, KCB (born 27 October 1946) is a retired senior officer of the Royal Navy who served as Lieutenant Governor of the Isle of Man from 2005 to 2011.

Early life
Haddacks was born on 27 October 1946. He was educated at Kingswood School, in Bath.

Military career
Having attended the Royal Naval College, Dartmouth, Haddacks joined the Royal Navy in 1964 and specialised in navigation. He commanded successively the frigates HMS Cleopatra and HMS Naiad. He went on to be assistant director of Navy Plans in the Ministry of Defence and was later given command of the assault ship HMS Intrepid. He became Senior Naval Officer Middle East and commander of UK maritime forces during Operation Desert Shield in 1990, Assistant Chief of Staff Policy and Requirements Division at SHAPE in 1994 and UK Military Representative to NATO in 1997. He was appointed Director of the International Military Staff at NATO in 2001 and retired in 2004.

Later life
Haddacks was the Lieutenant Governor of the Isle of Man from 17 October 2005 until 1 April 2011.

Honours and decorations
In the 2000 New Year Honours, Haddacks was appointed Knight Commander of the Order of the Bath (KCB).

He was appointed Honorary Colonel of the Isle of Man Army Cadet Force on 1 November 2005.

References

|-

 

1946 births
Living people
Royal Navy vice admirals
Knights Commander of the Order of the Bath
People educated at Kingswood School, Bath
Lieutenant Governors of the Isle of Man
Graduates of Britannia Royal Naval College